Jacques Jehan Nel (born 17 March 1993) is a South African professional rugby union player for  in the Rugby Pro D2. His regular position is centre or winger.

Career

Nel was born in Port Elizabeth, but grew up in Benoni, where he earned an inclusion to the  squad that competed at the Under-18 Craven Week tournament held in Kimberley in 2011.

Nel made the very short move to Johannesburg to the  Academy after high school. He appeared in all thirteen of the s' matches during the 2012 Under-19 Provincial Championship, starting twelve of those. He scored a try in both of their matches against  and two tries against  in George to help his side secure a semi-final place. However, they lost in the semi-finals, with  winning the match 24–14 in Stellenbosch.

The Golden Lions won the competition, beating the  42–28 in the final in Nelspruit.

Despite still being in the Under-20 age-group, Nel started all thirteen of the ' matches in the 2013 Under-21 Provincial Championship. He scored six tries – including a brace in their match against eventual champions  – as the Golden Lions finished in fourth spot. However, Nel lost in a semi-final to Western Province for the second consecutive year, who beat Golden Lions U21 44–41 after extra time.

Nel started the 2014 season by representing  in the 2014 Varsity Cup competition. He started in all seven their matches and scored a try in their 32–15 victory over rival Johannesburg-based university side . It proved to be a disappointing campaign for UJ, however, as they finished second-bottom in the competition to qualify for a relegation play-off match against . Nel also started this match, as UJ ran out 42–8 victors to retain their Varsity Cup status for 2015.

Nel made five starts and two substitute appearances for the Golden Lions during the 2015 Vodacom Cup.

Aurillac

Nel moved to French Pro D2 side  prior to the 2018–19 season.

Statistics

Personal life

He is the younger brother of South Africa Sevens international Ruhan Nel.

References

South African rugby union players
Living people
1993 births
Rugby union players from Port Elizabeth
Rugby union centres
Rugby union wings
Golden Lions players
Southern Kings players